Gusla Peak is the peak rising to 842 m in the southeast foothills of Detroit Plateau on Nordenskjöld Coast in Graham Land, Antarctica, at the NNW extremity of a narrow 3.9 km long rocky ridge surmounting Desudava Glacier to the north and east, Mundraga Bay to the southeast, and Boryana Glacier to the south.

The peak is named after the settlement of Gusla in Northeastern Bulgaria.

Location
British mapping in 1978.

Maps
 British Antarctic Territory.  Scale 1:200000 topographic map.  DOS 610 Series, Sheet W 64 60.  Directorate of Overseas Surveys, UK, 1978.
 Antarctic Digital Database (ADD). Scale 1:250000 topographic map of Antarctica. Scientific Committee on Antarctic Research (SCAR), 1993–2016.

Notes

References
 Gusla Peak. SCAR Composite Antarctic Gazetteer.
 Bulgarian Antarctic Gazetteer. Antarctic Place-names Commission. (details in Bulgarian, basic data in English)

External links
 Gusla Peak. Copernix satellite image

Mountains of Graham Land
Bulgaria and the Antarctic
Nordenskjöld Coast